Enagi Nataraj was a theatre actor who was a son of actor Enagi Balappa.

Early life
He was born to the couple Enagi Balappa and Laxmidevi. Enagi Nataraj made his first appearance as a child in the play Basaveshwara Mahatme. He was a student of the Rudrakshi Math's hostel in Belagavi. Nataraj worked in business for a small period of time before resuming his entertainment career. For more than a decade, he worked for director Nagabharana.

Filmography
Serials
 Mahanavami
 Sankranti
 Naku Tanti
 Kinnari 
 Idu Entha Lokavayya

Plays
 Haddu Needida Haadi
 Nata Samrat
 Jagajyoti Basaveshwara
 Burjwa Gentleman
 Policeriddare Echharike
 Oedipus
 Macbeth 
 Miss Sahara 
 Tadroopi
 Birudantembara Ganda
 Sambashiva Prahasana
 Naa Tukaram Alla

Movies
Bheema Teeradalli
 Savitri
 Neela
 Singaravva Mattu Aramane
Matte Mungaru
Avva
Abhi
 Sainik

Awards and honours
 He was a recipient of Karnataka Nataka Academy award.
 He was made as a director after Dharwad Rangayana was made autonomous.

Final work
Before his death, Nataraj had a play in progress about Kittur Rani Chennamma.

Death
Nataraj was suffering from liver and kidney related problems and he died at a private nursing home in Hubballi on 9 June 2012 following his illness. He was survived by his wife and two sons.

References

Year of birth missing
2012 deaths
Male actors from Karnataka